Steve DeLine (born August 19, 1961) is a former American football placekicker. He played for the San Diego Chargers in 1988 and for the Philadelphia Eagles in 1989.

References

1961 births
Living people
American football placekickers
Colorado State Rams football players
San Diego Chargers players
Philadelphia Eagles players